Pachyta lamed is the species of the Lepturinae subfamily in long-horned beetle family. This beetle is distributed in Austria, Belarus, Bulgaria, Czech Republic, Denmark, Estonia, Finland, France, Germany, Hungary, Italy, Japan, Latvia, Lithuania, Moldova, Mongolia, Norway, Poland, Romania, Russia, Slovakia, Slovenia, Sweden, Switzerland, Ukraine, and in United States, and Canada. Adult beetle feeds on Norway spruce.

Subtaxons 
There are two subspecies in species:
 Pachyta lamed lamed (Linnaeus, 1758) - Eurasian subspecies
 Pachyta lamed liturata Kirby, 1837 - North America subspecies

References

Lepturinae
Beetles described in 1758
Taxa named by Carl Linnaeus